My Name is the debut album by French singer-songwriter Mélanie Pain. After singing for new wave band Nouvelle Vague, Pain completed recording her first album, releasing it on April 21, 2009.

Track listing
All tracks written by Mélanie Pain.
 My Name – 4:36
 Celle de mes vingt ans (One of My Twenty Years) – 3:20
 Bruises – 3:48
 Everything I Know – 3:01
 Helsinki (feat. Julien Doré) – 5:09
 La cigarette – 3:48
 Little Cowboy – 1:29
 If You Knew – 3:27
 Ignore-moi (Ignore Me) – 3:08
 Peut-être pas (Maybe Not) – 3:13
 Adieu mon amour (Goodbye, My Love) – 3:36

References 

2009 albums